The Kurt Weill Centre is a cultural site in Dessau, in Saxony-Anhalt, Germany. It is a museum and information centre about the life and work of the composer Kurt Weill (1900–1950), who was born in Dessau.

History
The museum is in the Meisterhaus Feininger, built in 1925–26. It was one of the houses designed by Walter Gropius as accommodation for the masters of the Bauhaus; the artist Lyonel Feininger lived here from 1926 to 1932. (Apart from its location in Dessau, it has no direct connection with the life of the composer.) The building is included in the Blaubuch (Blue Book) of the Federal Government, as an important cultural site.

The Kurt Weill Centre was opened as the European centre for the composer's work, and a base for organizing the festival. It was accommodated initially in the nearby Meisterhaus Schlemmer in 1993, and relocated in the present building in December 1994 when renovation was complete.

Exhibition and library
There is a permanent exhibition about the composer; a special exhibition is shown at the time of the Kurt Weill Festival.

The library, open to interested visitors on request, contains sheet music, mainly by Kurt Weill, literature relating to classic modernism, CDs and DVDs.

See also
 List of music museums

References

Biographical museums in Germany
Music museums in Germany
Museums in Saxony-Anhalt
Walter Gropius buildings